Anustup Majumdar (born 30 April 1984) is an Indian first-class cricketer who plays for Bengal. He was born in Chinsurah and spent his early life there before moving onto Liluah. He plays for the Mohun Bagan cricket team in the CAB division. He is a right-hand batsman and leg-break bowler. He was a part of Pune Warriors squad in the Indian Premier League. Majumdar has played for India A cricket team in 2012.He was instrumental in the Bengal squad of 2019-2020 ranji trophy, where he scored a crucial 149 in the semi-finals against Karnataka in Eden gardens to reach 311 1st innings total and eventually went on to play the finals against Saurastra. This knock is remembered as one of the best in Bengal's Ranji Trophy history.

He was the leading run-scorer for Bengal in the 2017–18 Ranji Trophy, with 560 runs in six matches.

References

External links 

Indian cricketers
Pune Warriors India cricketers
Bengal cricketers
East Zone cricketers
Living people
1984 births
Seth Anandram Jaipuria College alumni
University of Calcutta alumni